Asmex Digital is a Sydney-based technology services company and one of Australia's SMB technology providers, which specialized on e-commerce consultation for small and medium businesses.

Company history
Asmex Digital Pty. Ltd. was incorporated in 2012 and is based in Alexandria, Australia. The Sydney-based company is led and is co founded by executive director Olivier Adolphe, a former executive of eBay, PayPal and the ASX  and data specialist and general manager Leo Chui on the board of C&J Capital, a private fund.

In February 2016 Asmex announces that it have acquired a new digital service business from an ASX - Australia Stock Exchange listed company Invigor Group (IVO:ASX).

The data solutions company Invigor Group Limited (ASX:IVO) signed an agreement for the sale of its services business to Asmex Digital. The services business was part of the client base of Global Group Australia acquired in 2014 but which is non-core to Invigor's activities. The transaction was capped at $500,000, based on the value of the business unit's performance in twelve months following the sales.

References

Technology companies
Technology companies established in 2012
2012 establishments in Australia
Companies based in Sydney